A hula hoop is a toy hoop that is twirled around the waist, limbs or neck. 

Hula Hoop may also refer to:

Music
 "The Hula Hoop Song", a 1958 single by Georgia Gibbs
 "Hula Hoop Song", a 1958 single by Maureen Evans
 "Hula Hoop" (Omi song), 2015
 "Hula Hoop" (Loona song), 2021
 "Hula Hoop", a song by Stella Mwangi from the 2011 album Kinanda

Other uses
 Hula Hoops, a snack food

See also
 Hulahop d.o.o., a Croatian company